J-Money may refer to:
 J-Money (rapper), half of rap duo Cadillac Don & J-Money
 Jonathan Erlichman, Canadian baseball coach